RWU is a three letter acronym that may stand for:

 Roger Williams University in Bristol, Rhode Island, in the US
  Remote wake-up, a command to power on a system from a distance, such as over a LAN
 Railroad Workers United, a cross-union rail workers’ reform group formerly known as Railroad Operating Crafts United